The Slaughter is the debut studio album by the American groove metal band Incite. It was released in 2009 on I Scream Music.

Track listing 
 "Intro" - 0:57
 "The Slaughter" - 3:00
 "Nothing to Fear" - 3:31
 "Army of Darkness" - 2:24
 "Time for a Change" - 3:45
 "Divided We Fail" - 3:16
 "Rage" - 3:56
 "Tyranny's End" - 3:52
 "Die with What You've Done" - 2:42
 "Down and Out" - 3:00
 "End Result" - 2:49
 "Awakening" - 4:05
 "Absence" - 2:58 (Japanese edition bonus track)

Personnel
 Richie Cavalera - vocals
 Luis Marrufo - bass
 Zak Sofaly - drums
 Kevin "Dis" McAllister - guitars

External links
 Allmusic

2009 debut albums
Incite albums
Albums produced by Logan Mader